The 2021 Diamond League, also known as the 2021 Wanda Diamond League for sponsorship reasons, is the twelfth season of the annual series of outdoor track and field meetings, organised by World Athletics. The 2021 season sees an increase back to 32 Diamond Disciplines from the 24 originally planned for the 2020 Diamond League. The final will use a new format set to take place over two days on 8–9 September in one final meet, the Weltklasse Zürich, as had been planned to be introduced in 2020 but was cancelled due to the COVID-19 pandemic.

A new award will be introduced for the "Best Performing Athletes" which will recognize ten athletes (five men and five women) for consistent top placements. 50,000 USD will be awarded to one man and one woman in each of the sprints, hurdles, distance runnings, jumps, and throws.

Schedule
The following fourteen meetings are scheduled to be included in the 2021 season.

The Bislett Games in Oslo were originally scheduled to be the fourth meeting on 10 June, but on 10 April was delayed to an undetermined date (later scheduled for 1 July). On April 16 the first meeting on the calendar, Meeting de Rabat, was cancelled and the British Grand Prix in Gateshead was reintroduced to take its place on the same date. Additionally, the Golden Gala was relocated from Rome to Florence and pushed back to 10 June. On 7 May, UK Athletics announced the Anniversary Games will be relocated from the London Stadium due to the prohibitive costs of repurposing the stadium for only the meeting. On 27 May the Anniversary Games were confirmed to be moved to Gateshead and renamed the Müller British Grand Prix.

Results

Men

Track

Field

Women

Track

Field

Diamond League Final

Men

Women

References

External links

Official website

 
Diamond League
Diamond League